Merilii Jalg (born September 20, 2001) is an Estonian  draughts player, gold medalist of the Estonian women's championship in International and in Russian draughts (both 2018). The elder sister of the shashlist, Triinu Jalg (born 2005).

Sports biography
At the adult level, she has been competing since the year 2015. She is trained by Arno Uutma.
2015
 7th place at the Estonian Women's Championship in International draughts
2016
 4th place at the Estonian Women's Championship in International draughts

 4th place in the Estonian Women's Championship in Russian draughts
2017
 2nd place in the Estonian Championship among women in Russian draughts
 15th place at the Women's World Draughts Championship
2018
 Estonian champion among women in Russian draughts
 Estonian champion among women in International draughts
 27th place at the Women's World Draughts Championship (Rapid)

References

External links
 World Draughts Federation
 WORLD CHAMPIONSHIP WOMEN. List of players
  Koninklijke Nederlandse Dambond
ESBL

Estonian draughts players
2001 births
Living people